Qabaleh may refer to:
 Qabaleh, Ardabil
 Qabaleh, Fars
 Qabaleh-ye Firuzi, Fars Province